Joseph Trail Shippen (6 January 1876 – 10 May 1952) was an Australian rules footballer who played with Essendon in the Victorian Football League (VFL).

Notes

External links 

1876 births
1952 deaths
Australian rules footballers from Victoria (Australia)
Essendon Football Club players